Sérgio Esteves (born 13 June 1968) is a Portuguese freestyle swimmer. He competed in two events at the 1988 Summer Olympics.

References

External links
 

1971 births
Living people
Portuguese male freestyle swimmers
Olympic swimmers of Portugal
Swimmers at the 1988 Summer Olympics
Place of birth missing (living people)